Angelina Branković (ca. 1440–1520), née Arianiti, was the Albanian Despotess consort of Serbian Despot Stefan Branković (r. 1458–1459), and a daughter of Prince Gjergj Arianiti. For her pious life she was proclaimed a saint and venerated as such by the Serbian Orthodox Church as Venerable Mother Angelina.

Life

Angelina, born as a member of Arianiti family was the sixth daughter of Albanian Nobleman Gjergj Arianiti (1383–1462) and his first wife Princess Maria Muzaka. In 1460, she married exiled Serbian ruler Stefan Branković (r. 1458–59), son of the former Serbian Despot Đurađ Branković (r. 1427–1456). They met when Stefan came to Northern Albania, to visit Albanian Prince Skanderbeg, who was married to Angelina's elder sister Andronika.

The couple left Albania for Northern Italy, and acquired castle Belgrado in the region of Friuli. Stefan died in 1476, at family estate in Belgrado. At first, Angelina and their children remained in northern Italy. In 1479, emperor Friedrich III granted them castle Weitensfeld, and Angelina with her children moved to Carinthia.

In 1485, their cousin, titular Serbian Despot Vuk Branković died, and Hungarian king Matthias Corvinus invited Angelina's sons to take over their dynastic inheritance. Angelina and her family went to the Kingdom of Hungary, where her elder son, George, became new titular despot of the Serbian Despotate (1486). The territory of the Despotate had been under the Ottoman Empire since its collapse in 1459. Later Angelina retired in the Krušedol Monastery, in the Fruška Gora mountain of Syrmia, where she died in the beginning of the 16th century.

Marriage and children
Angelina and Stefan were married from 1461 until his death in 1476. They had children:

 Đorđe (d. 18 January 1516). Titular despot of Serbia (1486), under the auspices of the Kingdom of Hungary. Married to Isabella del Balzo, daughter of Agilberto, Duke of Nardò. Later retired as a monk, under the monastic name "Maxim". Served as Metropolitan of Ungro-Wallachia until 1508, later becoming Metropolitan of Belgrade.
 Jovan (d. 10 December 1502). Titular despot of Serbia, under the auspices of the Kingdom of Hungary. Married to Jelena Jakšić, member of powerful House of Jakšić.  They had several daughters, but no male issue.
 Maria, Marchioness of Montferrat (d. 27 August 1495), named after her maternal grandmother Princess Maria Muzaka. She married Boniface III, Marquess of Montferrat (1424–1494, reign 1483–1494), with whom she had two sons.

Sainthood
Members of the Branković dynasty were known among contemporaries for their devotion to Eastern Orthodox Christianity, and Angelina belonged to the same tradition. She is venerated as a saint by the Serbian Orthodox Church as Venerable Mother Angelina and her feast day is July 30, while she is also venerated on December 10, together with her husband, St. Stephen, and her son, St. John. She wrote a hagiography known as Hagiography of Mother Angelina (/Žitije majke Angeline).

Annotations

See also

 List of Serbian saints
 List of Eastern Orthodox saints
Arianiti family
 Branković dynasty

References

Sources 

 
 
 
 
 
 
 
 
 

15th-century Serbian royalty
Medieval Serbian royal consorts
Angelina of Serbia
Angelina of Serbia
Angelina of Serbia
Angelina
Year of birth uncertain
1520 deaths
People from Berat
Eastern Orthodox royal saints
Eastern Orthodox Christians from Albania